Graue is a surname. Notable people with the surname include:

Arnfinn Graue (born 1926), Norwegian nuclear physicist
M. Elizabeth Graue, American academic
Michael Graue (born 1996), American actor

See also
Graue Mill, a grist mill in Oak Brook, Illinois, United States

Surnames from nicknames